The Stroud by-election of May was fought on 15 May 1874.  Caused by the election of Liberal MP, Sebastian Stewart Dickinson being declared void on petition on "account of treating, but the treating was not with knowledge of the candidates".  It was retained by the  Liberals.

References

1874 in England
1874 elections in the United Kingdom
Stroud District
By-elections to the Parliament of the United Kingdom in Gloucestershire constituencies
19th century in Gloucestershire